Jean-Philippe Lemoine (born 11 September 1964) is a French former ice hockey player. He competed in the men's tournaments at the 1988 Winter Olympics, the 1992 Winter Olympics and the 1998 Winter Olympics.

References

External links

1964 births
Living people
Brest Albatros Hockey players
Brûleurs de Loups players
Dragons de Rouen players
Frankfurt Lions players
French ice hockey defencemen
Granby Bisons players
Ice hockey players at the 1988 Winter Olympics
Ice hockey players at the 1992 Winter Olympics
Ice hockey players at the 1998 Winter Olympics
Laval Voisins players
Longueuil Chevaliers players
French expatriate sportspeople in Canada
French expatriate ice hockey people
Olympic ice hockey players of France
Sportspeople from Drôme